Counsel for Romance (French: Un mauvais garçon) is a 1936 French romantic comedy film directed by Jean Boyer and Raoul Ploquin and starring Danielle Darrieux, Henri Garat and Jean Dax.

Production
The film was made as a co-production between the German studio UFA and its French subsidiary ACE. It was made at UFA's Babelsberg Studios in Berlin, with location shooting taking place in Paris. The film's sets were designed by the art directors Artur Günther and Max Knaake. The music is by Georges Van Parys.

Plot
A young female lawyer refuses to get married as she thinks only of her work. But soon her father sends a crook so that she dedicates herself. Gradually, she begins to love the charming swindler.

Cast
Danielle Darrieux as Jacqueline Serval 
Henri Garat as Pierre Meynard 
 André Alerme as Monsieur Serval
Marguerite Templey as Mme. Serval 
Madeleine Suffel as Marie
 Jean Dax as Feutrier père  
 Alfred Pasquali as P'tit Louis 
 Léon Arvel as Le juge d'instruction  
 Lucien Callamand as Le voisin de palier  
 Robert Casa as Le bâtonnier / President of the Bar  
 Jean Hébey as Fil-de-fer / Slim  
 Roger Legris as Le vicomte 
 Edouard Hamel as Le secrétaire du bâtonnier  
 Bill Bocket as Le client violent au musette  
 Emile Prud'homme as L'accordéoniste / Accordionist

Notes

External links

Counsel for Romance at AlloCiné
Counsel for Romance at Evene.fr

1936 films
French black-and-white films
1930s French-language films
French romantic comedy films
1936 romantic comedy films
Films shot in Paris
UFA GmbH films
Films directed by Raoul Ploquin
Films directed by Jean Boyer
Films shot at Babelsberg Studios
1930s French films